The 1931 Yukon general election was held on 10 August 1931 to elect the three members of the Yukon Territorial Council. The council was non-partisan and had merely an advisory role to the federally appointed Commissioner.

Members
Dawson - Andrew Taddie
Mayo - Thomas MacKay
Whitehorse - Willard "Deacon" Phelps

References

1931
1931 elections in Canada
Election
August 1931 events